Janko Kersnik (4 September 1852 – 28 July 1897) was a Slovene writer and politician. Together with Josip Jurčič, he is considered the most important representative of literary realism in Slovene.

Biography 

Kersnik was born in Brdo Manor near Lukovica in Upper Carniola, then part of the Austrian Duchy of Carniola (now in Slovenia). His father Jože Kersnik was a district judge, while his mother Berta Höffern was a local noblewoman. Kersnik grew up in a bilingual, German-Slovene environment. He attended the German-language grammar school in Ljubljana, but was expelled under accusations of Slovene nationalism. He continued his studies under the private tutorship of Fran Levec, an influential Young Slovene literary historian.

He studied law at the University of Vienna and Graz, where he graduated in 1874. He worked in the Austro-Hungarian administration in Ljubljana between 1874 and 1878, where he opened a civil law notary office in his native Brdo pri Lukovici.

In the late 1870s, he became active in politics in the liberal Young Slovene party. In 1883, he was elected to the Carniolan provincial diet. Together with Fran Šuklje, He belonged to the moderate faction of the Slovene Liberals, and opposed both the conservatism of the Old Slovenes, the centralism of Austrian liberals, and the Slovene radical national liberalism, advocated by Ivan Hribar and Ivan Tavčar.

He died in Ljubljana in 1897.

Literary work 
Kersnik started his literary career as a German-language poet. Under the influence of Slovene post-Romantic authors Josip Stritar and Simon Jenko, he began writing in Slovene. He first wrote in late Romantic style, but under the influence of his personal friend Josip Jurčič, he switched to literary realism. He was a prolific author of short stories, feuilletons, and satires, in which he critically assessed the backwardness of the Slovene Lands of his time, and the radicalization of political life.

Bibliography 

 Na Žerinjah, 1876 
 Rokovnjači – finished after death of Josipa Jurčiča, 1881 
 Lutrski ljudje, 1882 
 Ciklamen, 1883 
 Gospod Janez, 1884 
 Agitator, 1885 
 Mačkova očeta, 1886
 Testament, 1887 
 Dohtar Konec in njegov konj, 1888 
 Kako je stari Molek tatu iskal, 1889 
 Kmetske slike, 1891 
 Jara gospoda, 1893 
 Očetov greh, 1894

Sources 
Biographical entry in the Slovenian Biographical Lexicon: Kersnik, Janko

References 

1852 births
1897 deaths
People from the Municipality of Lukovica
Slovenian people of German descent
Young Slovenes politicians
Members of the Diet of the Duchy of Carniola
Slovenian writers
University of Vienna alumni
University of Graz alumni